Mark Eaton (1957–2021) was an American basketball player.

Mark Eaton may also refer to:

 Mark Eaton (cricketer) (born 1953), Australian cricketer
 Mark Eaton (ice hockey) (born 1977), American professional ice hockey player

See also
Mark Eaton Walker (born 1967), American judge
Mark Eden (1928–2021), English actor
Mark Eden, company that sold Mark Eden bust developer